Vitali Klitschko vs Derek Chisora, billed as Showdown in Munich, was a professional boxing match that was contested between WBC heavyweight champion, Vitali Klitschko, and the WBC's number 15 ranked contender, Derek Chisora. The bout took place on 18 February 2012 at the Olympiahalle, with Klitschko winning by unanimous decision.

Background
Klitschko had first become heavyweight champion in 1999, when he won the WBO title from Herbie Hide. In his third title defense against Chris Byrd, Klitschko was forced to retire with a shoulder injury at the end of the ninth round, losing his title and unbeaten record. Five consecutive victories earned him a world title challenge against WBC champion Lennox Lewis in 2003. In a close, competitive fight, Klitschko was ahead on the scorecards before the referee called a halt to the contest at the end of the sixth round, deeming a deep cut on Klitschko's eye meant that he was unable to continue. With Lewis now retired, Klitschko faced Corrie Sanders for the vacant WBC title and won via technical knockout in the eighth round. After one defence, he made his first retirement from boxing. After returning to the ring following a four-year hiatus in 2008, he regained the WBC title by stopping Samuel Peter after eight rounds. He made seven successful title defences, and following his win over Tomasz Adamek, was looking to make an eighth consecutive defence of his championship in his third title reign.

Chisora had become British champion in 2010 after knocking out Danny Williams, and added the Commonwealth title later in the year, stopping Sam Sexton in his first defence. Chisora was then scheduled to face IBF, WBO, IBO and The Ring heavyweight champion, Wladimir Klitschko, but Klitschko pulled out of the fight three days prior with a torn abdominal muscle. The fight was later rescheduled, but this was cancelled so Klitschko could fight a unification against David Haye. Chisora made a mandatory defence of his British championship, against undefeated Tyson Fury. Chisora lost his titles and unbeaten record by unanimous decision. Chisora then challenged for the vacant European title against undefeated Robert Helenius in Helsinki. Helenius won by split decision after two judges scored the fight 115–113 to Helenius and the third scored it 115–113 to Chisora. The decision was highly controversial as many pundits and observers thought Chisora had won the fight. Sources in Germany reported that Kltschko and Chisora were likely to fight on 18 February 2012 at the Olympiahalle in Munich. This was later confirmed on 12 December 2011 that Chisora would be Klitschko's next opponent.

Chisora was heavily criticised for his behaviour at the weigh-in after slapping Klitschko across the face when the two went head-to-head during the staredown. More controversy ensued moments before the fight when he spat water in the face of Wladimir whilst in the ring before the pre-fight introductions.

The fight
Klitschko boxed a disciplined fight with changing angles and superior footwork, and was able to keep the aggressive and offensive Chisora at range for the majority of the rounds. Despite bobbing and weaving, and constant pressure applied by Chisora, Klitschko was able to use his height and reach advantage to land clean straight right hands and power shots from a distance to outland Chisora, and control the pace as the bout progressed. At times, Chisora was able to deliver some punishment of his own, with most of his work coming with body shots and hooks to Klitschko's head, forcing Klitschko onto the back foot, and his best rounds being the eighth and twelfth round.

All three judges unanimously scored the fight in favour of Klitschko, with scores of 118-110, 118-110 and 119-111. Despite being a decisive victory for Klitschko, Chisora earned credit for his chin and heart, and also for giving Klitschko his most competitive fight since his defeat to Lennox Lewis in 2003. Chisora also became only the fourth man (after Tino Hoffmann, Kevin Johnson and Shannon Briggs), to take Klitschko the twelve round distance.

Aftermath
In the post-fight press conference, a brawl ensued between Chisora and former heavyweight champion David Haye. After the altercation, Chisora challenged Haye to a fight in the ring, which subsequently paved the way for the pair's own grudge match later in the year.

Fight card

Broadcasting

References 

2012 in boxing
World Boxing Council heavyweight championship matches
Boxing in Germany
2012 in German sport
Sports competitions in Munich
2010s in Munich
Klitschko brothers
February 2012 sports events in Europe
Boxing matches